The Volkswagen Passat Lingyu is a Chinese mid-size car produced by Volkswagen with its joint venture Shanghai Volkswagen plants in Anting and Nanjing.

Overview
The Passat Lingyu was launched in November 2005 and replaced the Volkswagen Passat (B5) sold internationally. It is based on the same platform as the Škoda Superb I with more luxurious trim levels. In 2009, it was replaced by a facelift variant called the Volkswagen Passat New Lingyu.

The Passat Lingyu was offered in following equipment lines: Standard (标准型), Luxury (豪华型), VIP and Flagship (旗舰型). The Standard had a four-cylinder engine with a displacement of 1984 cc and a power of 85 kW. The Luxury and the VIP were delivered with a turbo engine with a displacement of 1781 cc and a power of 110 kW. The Flagship was the top model of the Lingyu lineup. It was motorized with a V6 engine with a displacement of 2771 cc and a power of 140 kW.

The car was designed by Istanbul-born car designer Murat Günak.

Volkswagen built 20 examples of fuel-cell Passat Lingyu in mid-2008 to be presented at the 2008 Beijing Olympics.

Facelift
A facelifted version was launched in 2009 and replaced the Volkswagen Passat Lingyu. The Passat New Lingyu was offered in following equipment lines: Zenjie, Zenping, Zenxiang, Zhizen and Zenshi.

The following engines were offered: 1984 cc (85 kW); 1781 cc (110 kW); 2771 cc (140 kW).

The Passat New Lingyu was replaced by the Volkswagen Passat NMS in April 2011.

References

External links 
O fficial website (Lingyu)
O fficial website (New Lingyu)

Passat Lingyu
Mid-size cars
Front-wheel-drive vehicles
Sedans
Cars introduced in 2005
Cars of China